Kim C. Border was an American behavioral economist and professor of economics at the California Institute of Technology.

Career 
Border received a bachelor's degree in economics from Caltech in 1974. Shortly after completing his Ph.D. in economics at the University of Minnesota in 1979, he returned to Caltech as a faculty member, where he remained for over forty years.

Border specialized in decision theory and auction design. In 1991, he proved a set of inequalities (now known as "Border's theorem") that characterize the possible allocations for a single-item auction, a result that now plays a key role in the computational design of auctions. He also contributed several applications of Arrow's impossibility theorem to economic domains.

Border was also known for his teaching in subjects of mathematical economics, and for his extensive in-depth lecture notes.

Personal life 
Border died on November 19, 2020 and is survived by his son.

Selected publications

References 

1952 births
2020 deaths
American economists
California Institute of Technology alumni
University of Minnesota alumni
California Institute of Technology faculty